Sistahs is the debut album of Big Joanie. It was released in 2018 on Thurston Moore and Eva Prinz's Daydream Library Series label after the two saw the band open for The Ex and discovered that the band had yet to release an album.

Composition
Sistahs holds musical footing in art punk, post-punk and "fearlessly discordant" punk rock. It has been noted for pushing the latter genre forward. However, its songs are musically eclectic and experimental, with goth, jangle pop, lo-fi and trance sounds nestled in it.

Leading single "Fall Asleep" is a "tough" dance-punk song that "burst[s] forth with synths and handclaps", recalling 80s and 90s sounds. It also dons a "power pop base" and a "light new wave trance".   "Used To Be Friends" takes on early-80s indie pop while echoing riot grrrl. "Down Down" is "sexy" surf rock with "a demented surf pop riff". "How Could You Love Me" has "rolling" melodies of 50s power pop.

Reception

Upon its release, Sistahs was welcomed with generally positive reviews from music critics. On Metacritic, it holds a score of 73 out of 100, indicating "generally favorable reviews", based on four reviews.

The Quietus called the album "a fresh and rich take on DIY punk." Rolling Stone gave the album 3.5 stars and said "It's a record that’s bold, catchy and arresting."

Accolades

Track listing
All songs by Big Joanie.

Personnel
All credits adapted from the record's Bandcamp page.

Big Joanie
 Stephanie Phillips - vocals, guitar
 Estella Adeyeri - bass 
 Chardine Taylor-Stone - drums

Additional musicians
 Seth Evans - Wurlitzer on "Cut Your Hair"

Technical 
 Margo Broom - production, recording, mixing

References

2018 debut albums
2017 debut albums